The LSU Sports Network is the radio and television network of the Louisiana State University Tigers and Lady Tigers men's and women's sports teams. It consists of eleven television stations, two regional cable networks, and several radio stations throughout the state of Louisiana and surrounding states. Its headquarters are located in Baton Rouge, Louisiana and it is owned by LSU Sports Properties.

WDGL 98.1 FM (Eagle 98.1) in Baton Rouge, Louisiana is the flagship station for football, men's basketball and baseball. WBRP 107.3 FM (Talk 107.3) in Baton Rouge, Louisiana is the flagship station for women's basketball and softball.

On-air personalities

Current
As of the 2017–18 season:

Former "Voice of the Tigers"
John Ferguson – Play-by-play commentator (men's basketball, football) (1946–1958, 1961–1987)
J.C. Politz – Play-by-play commentator (men's basketball, football) (1959–1960)
Jim Hawthorne – Play-by-play commentator (baseball, men's basketball, football) (1979–2016)

Former LSU radio analysts
Walter Hill – Analyst (football) (1961–1986)

Former LSU Radio sideline reporters
Jordy Hultberg (2002–2010)

Programming

History
The LSU Athletic Department and LSU Sports Properties produces in-house weekly television and radio coaches shows. Sports covered are baseball, men's basketball, women's basketball, football, gymnastics and softball. Starting during 1999–2000 season, all coaches shows have been streamed live and made available on-demand on LSUsports.net. LSU was among the first universities to offer such a subscription-based service to its fans through what is now called the "Geaux Zone". Internet-only shows such as "The Dot TV Show" and "Tiger Talk" have also been offered as a supplement to the 30-minute coaches TV shows. In 2016, LSU began free streaming on-demand live game broadcasts and live video of certain non-game action like coaches’ television shows, news conferences and special presentations on LSUsports.net.

Coach's shows

Radio 
The Brian Kelly Show  
The Matt McMahon Show 
The Nikki Fargas Show
The Paul Mainieri Show
LSU Sixty
Fresh Take with Coach O

Television 
Inside LSU Football with Ed Orgeron 
Inside LSU Basketball with Will Wade
Inside Lady Tigers Basketball with Nikki Fargas
Inside LSU Baseball with Paul Mainieri
Inside LSU Gymnastics with D-D Breaux
Inside LSU Softball with Beth Torina

Radio stations
The stations listed below broadcast both men's and women's sports.

Satellite Radio
In a partnership with LSU Sports Properties, SiriusXM simulcasts all LSU football games and various other sports on their regional play-by-play channels: 190, 191 and 192.

Over the air television stations

Pay-per-view television

TigerVision
TigerVision was the LSU Athletics Department in-house pay-per-view television broadcast channel providing live coverage of select non-network-televised LSU Tigers football games and also LSU Tigers basketball games and LSU Tigers baseball games from 1982 through 2013. Broadcasts were offered only to cable outlets inside the state of Louisiana and also on ESPN's GamePlan package outside of Louisiana. TigerVision produced all the coach's TV shows for football, men's basketball, women's basketball and baseball during its existence. With the creation of the SEC Network, Southeastern Conference member schools had to give up their rights for pay-per-view telecasts.

TigerVision football announcers
Play-by-play
Paul Hornung - Play-by-play (1982) 
Jim Taylor - Play-by-play (1982)
Steve Schneider - Play-by-play (1983)
John Ferguson - Play-by-play (1984–87)  
Doug Greengard - Play-by-play (2001–13) 

Analysts
Doug Moreau - Analyst (1982–87)
Greg Bowser - Analyst (2000s) 
Renee Nadeau - Analyst (2000s)

TigerVision basketball announcers
Play-by-play
Tim Brando - Play-by-play (1982–86) 

Analysts
Jordy Hultberg - Analyst

Regional cable networks

References

External links
LSU Sports Properties official website

Sports Network
College basketball on the radio in the United States
College football on the radio
Radio stations in Louisiana
Television stations in Louisiana
Sports radio networks in the United States